Annona ekmanii is a species of plant in the Annonaceae family. It is endemic to Cuba.

References

Flora of Cuba
ekmanii
Vulnerable plants
Taxonomy articles created by Polbot